"The Path of Duty" is the fourth episode of the first series of the British television series, Upstairs, Downstairs. The episode is set in 1905, and introduces the character of Elizabeth Bellamy (Nicola Pagett). It is one of five episodes shot in black-and-white due to an industrial dispute.

Cast
Regular cast
 Gordon Jackson (Mr. Angus Hudson)
 Angela Baddeley (Mrs. Kate Bridges)
 Jean Marsh (Rose Buck)
 David Langton (Richard Bellamy)
 Rachel Gurney (Lady Marjorie Bellamy)
 Simon Williams (James Bellamy)
 Nicola Pagett (Elizabeth Bellamy)
 Patsy Smart (Miss Maude Roberts)
 George Innes (Alfred)
 Evin Crowley (Emily)

Guest cast
 Margaretta Scott (Aunt Kate)
 John Quayle (Lieutenant Watson) 
 Brian Osborne (Pearce) 
 Elma Soiron (Madame Dubois) 
 Jessica Benton (Lady Cynthia Cartwright) 
 Christopher Moran (The Errand Boy)

Plot
In May, 1905 Elizabeth Bellamy returns from studying in Germany. She wants to make the entrée into London society and her society debut. She has an abundance of "radical" notions and a noncomformist behaviour. During her first society ball, at which she is to be presented to King Edward VII she runs away.

References

Upstairs, Downstairs (series 1) episodes
1971 British television episodes
Fiction set in 1904